Johnston Murray (July 21, 1902 – April 16, 1974) was an American lawyer, politician, and the 14th governor of Oklahoma from 1951 to 1955. He was a member of the Democratic Party.

Murray was the first Native American to be elected as governor in the United States. Murray's mother, Mary Alice Hearrell, was a citizen of the Chickasaw Nation. His father, William H. Murray, by virtue of his marriage to Hearrell in 1899, also became a citizen of the nation under Chickasaw law. The elder Murray was an advisor to Governor Douglas H. Johnston of the Chickasaw Nation, and later served in numerous political offices after Oklahoma was admitted as a state. He served as the ninth governor of Oklahoma (1931–1935).

As governor 20 years later, Johnston Murray attempted to reduce state spending but was blocked by state legislators, although they were part of the Democratic majority. The state constitution prohibited a second succeeding term, and his second wife Willie Murray ran for governor in 1954. She failed to win. They broke up in a bitter public divorce proceeding, which began a few months later. The divorce was final in 1956.

Murray later married Helen Shutt. They moved to Fort Worth, Texas, where he worked for an oil well servicing company and later a limousine service. After returning to Oklahoma City, Murray formed a law partnership with Whit Pate in February 1960. He ran for Oklahoma State Treasurer in 1962, but finished last in the four-man Democratic primary field. He later worked for the remainder of his career as a consulting attorney for the Oklahoma Department of Welfare. Both he and his father were buried in Tishomingo, Oklahoma.

Early life and education
Murray was born July 21, 1902, in the mansion of the Chickasaw Nation's Governor at Emet, Johnston County, Indian Territory. His mother, Mary Alice Hearrell, was one-eighth Chickasaw. She was the niece of Douglas H. Johnston, the  noted Chickasaw Governor for whom her husband William H. Murray was then working as a legal advisor. The senior Murray later served both with the 1905 convention that drafted a constitution for the State of Sequoyah, and as president of the 1906 convention that drafted Oklahoma's constitution prior to its admission. Following state and national offices, he was elected in 1930 as the ninth Governor of Oklahoma, serving 1931-1935.

Johnston Murray was one of five children. Growing up in a doubly prominent political family, the younger Murray was educated in the public schools of Tishomingo, Oklahoma, the former capital of the Chickasaw Nation. He attended college at the Murray State School of Agriculture (now Murray State College), graduating in 1924.

Unlike his mother, Johnston Murray never chose to enroll as a citizen of the Chickasaw Nation. When elected as state governor, Murray was the first Native American in the United States to hold a gubernatorial office, although he is not always considered such, due to him not being an enrolled Native citizen.

In 1923 Johnston Murray married Marion Draughon of Sulphur, Oklahoma. They had one child together before getting divorced six years later.

Early career
After college, Murray traveled to Bolivia with his father and brothers and their families from Oklahoma. They were trying to establish a private colony there to develop a large ranching operation. They lived there for four years working on this project, but did not receive sufficient support from the government. 

When Murray returned to Oklahoma, he worked in oil and gas fields, rising to the role of plant manager.

Murray divorced his wife Marion in 1929. He married again in 1933, to Willie Roberta Emerson. She was a concert pianist and known for her drive and ambition.

Political career
Murray joined and became active in the Democratic Party, which dominated state politics. In 1940 he was elected as chairman of the Oklahoma Electoral College, and he served as a member of the Electoral College in 1948. He had returned to graduate school, and in 1947 received his law degree from Oklahoma City University School of Law.

Murray also served as Democratic chair of Oklahoma's 8th congressional district and as chair of local political groups in Kay and Oklahoma counties. He served as chair of the Oklahoma Election Board and secretary of the Oklahoma Land Commission.

Governor of Oklahoma
Through these activities Johnston Murray had increased his own name recognition, and was also known as the son of the well-known, flamboyant politician and ninth governor of the state, William H. Murray. Johnston Murray was elected Governor of Oklahoma in November 1950 and sworn into office on January 21, 1951. His 81-year old father, "Alfalfa Bill" Murray, administered the oath of office.

Murray's main campaign theme had been to reduce spending by the state government and reduce taxes. His program included continuing to consolidate schools to improve education (begun under his predecessor, Governor Roy J. Turner), changing the ad valorem tax to return more of the property taxes to local school districts, and expanding highway and toll road systems.

Murray received an honorary degree of Doctor of Law on 7 July 1952 from Sequoia University, which had established legal headquarters in Oklahoma at the time.  

Although working with a Democratic-majority legislature, Murray vetoed forty bills in four years, the highest number in forty years of Oklahoma politics.  He had some notable successes: he was the first Oklahoma governor to be elected as Chairman of the Southern Governors Conference. He funding of the Turner Turnpike, which had been authorized by the legislature in 1947 and was completed in 1953, during his administration. He was instrumental in the state purchase of fairgrounds in Oklahoma City. In 1954 Murray toured Central and South American countries on behalf of the United States Information Service. He also served as chairman of the Interstate Oil Compact Commission.

Johnston and Willie 
Murray's wife and first lady of Oklahoma, Willie Murray, was noted for her charm and intelligence. She also had ambition and drive. Her first action after Murray's inauguration was to open the governor's mansion to public visitors every Thursday. She welcomed up to 3,000 people weekly, who lined up at the door for entrance.

Being in office resulted in new tensions between Murray and his wife, and he began to chafe against their differences. Willie complained that he drank too much. He responded that she was too bossy. According to a 2015 account, he reportedly said during his tenure, “Damn it, I got elected, not her.”

The state constitution prohibited successive terms in the governor's office, so Murray could to run again in 1954.  Before his term was up, his wife Willie Murray announced that she would run for the office in 1954. The campaign was considered a farce. When she was the first state-wide candidate to campaign for office by helicopter, one reporter wrote that the helicopter, "... was the only thing that got off the ground."

After the 1954 election, Murray filed for divorce. Willie fought back, asking for separate maintenance and alleging grounds of adultery and public drunkenness by him. Their brawl went public. Murray asked for another chance; she named another woman as co-respondent, and published letters from Murray declaring his intention to divorce. He said these were lies. Their divorce on grounds of incompatibility was made final in 1956. His settlement included making a $75,000 payment to Willie, deeding her the family's home in Oklahoma City and a Ford automobile, and giving her a copy of the movie of her gubernatorial campaign. Willie also got the last word. When Murray announced that he had changed his political affiliation and supported Republican Dwight Eisenhower for President in 1956, Willie reportedly said, “He never has been much of a Democrat.”

Later years and death
Murray married a third time, to Helen Shutt in 1956. He lived and worked for a period in Fort Worth, Texas, where he worked for an oil well servicing firm, and then a limousine service.

After returning to Oklahoma City, Murray set up a law partnership with Whit Pate in 1960. He ran for the Democratic nomination for State Treasurer in 1962, but Murray finished last in the four-man primary, gaining 18.24% of the vote (77,881 votes).

Murray later served as a consulting  attorney with the Oklahoma Department of Public Welfare until his death on April 16, 1974. He is buried in Tishomingo, Oklahoma, where both his parents were also buried.

See also 
 List of minority governors and lieutenant governors in the United States

Notes

References

External links

 
 National Governors Association
 Oklahoma Historical Society

|-

1902 births
1974 deaths
20th-century American lawyers
20th-century American politicians
Methodists from Oklahoma
American people of Chickasaw descent
Native American state governors of the United States
Democratic Party governors of Oklahoma
Governors of Oklahoma
Oklahoma City University alumni
Oklahoma Democrats
Oklahoma lawyers
People from Johnston County, Oklahoma
People of Indian Territory
Oklahoma Republicans
Texas Republicans